The Naked World of Harrison Marks is a 1966 British pseudo-documentary about adult film director and photographer George Harrison Marks. It takes a look at his daily life, with added dream sequences, and is narrated by Valentine Dyall. The film was mainly shot at Harrison Marks' studios at Lily Place, London, with the occasional location such as Ewhurst Manor. It was during the auditions for the film that George Harrison Marks met his future wife, Toni Burnett.

Even though it had censorship troubles with the BBFC due to its abundant nudity, it ran for over a year in London's West End.

References

External links

The Naked World of Harrison Marks at TCMDB
The (Naked) World of Harrison Marks at Never Knowingly Overdressed

1966 films
British documentary films
Nudity in film
1960s English-language films
1960s British films